Brett Rypien (born July 9, 1996) is a Canadian-American football quarterback who is a free agent. He played college football at Boise State and signed with the Denver Broncos as an undrafted free agent in 2019. He is the nephew of Super Bowl XXVI MVP quarterback Mark Rypien.

Early years
Rypien was born to Tim and Julie Rypien in Spokane, Washington. Growing up, he was a multiple-sport athlete, playing football in addition to baseball, the sport his father had played at the minor league level.

Rypien attended Shadle Park High School in Spokane, Washington. At Shadle Park he played quarterback for all four years of high school. By the time he graduated, he had set Washington state records for career passing yards (13,044), formerly held by former Boise State quarterback Kellen Moore; pass completions (1,006); single-season records for passing yards (4,552) and touchdowns (50), both previously held by Kellen Moore; single-game records for passing yards (613); and pass completions (44). Rypien graduated early from Shadle Park as a 4.0GPA student, earning valedictorian honors.

Rypien was rated by both Rivals and Scout as a four-star recruit coming out of high school. He verbally committed to Boise State University in April 2014 and enrolled in January 2015.

High school accomplishments
Awards
 2014 Washington State Player of the Year
 3× Washington 3A All-State

Washington state records
 Career passing yards (13,044)
 Career completions (1,006)
 Single-season passing yards (4,552)
 Single-season passing touchdowns (50)
 Single-game passing yards (613)
 Single-game completions (44)

College career

2015

Rypien began taking classes at Boise State in January 2015; he had enrolled early so he could take part in spring practices. With two-year starting quarterback Grant Hedrick graduating from Boise State, it left a hole at the quarterback position. On August 23, at the close of fall practice, Ryan Finley was named the Broncos' starting quarterback and Rypien was left to redshirt for his freshman season.

In the third game of the Broncos' season, against Idaho State, Finley was tackled from behind in the first half of the game, breaking his left ankle, which would require an eight-week recovery time. Rypien entered the game in the second half, burning his redshirt, and led the offense to scores on each of his four possessions, three touchdowns and one field goal. Rypien became the first true freshman quarterback to play in a game for Boise State since 1993.

In Rypien's first three starts of his Boise State career, the Broncos averaged over 50 points per game, and Rypien averaged over 300 yards in each contest and totaled eight touchdowns. In his sixth start, against the UNLV Rebels, he set the Boise State record for most passing yards in a game by a freshman, besting Kellen Moore's previous mark of 414 yards with 469 yards of his own. In the following game, Rypien topped his own record by passing for 506 yards against the New Mexico Lobos.

For Rypien's efforts he was named the first-team all-conference quarterback of the Mountain West Conference, becoming the first freshman to do so in the conference's 17-year history. In addition to earning first-team all-conference, Rypien was also awarded Freshman of the Year honors of the Mountain West.

Rypien and the Broncos finished the season with a 9–4 record, and concluded the season with a record-setting win in the Poinsettia Bowl against the Northern Illinois Huskies. Rypien also picked up the offensive MVP honor for this performance.

2016

In Rypien's second year at Boise State, he was with new coordinators in Zak Hill and Scott Huff after Eliah Drinkwitz left to take a coordinator position at NC State. With the hire of new offensive coordinators, and Ryan Finley returning from a broken ankle, Bryan Harsin stated that there would be an open quarterback competition during spring practices.

On December 27, 2015 Alex Ogle announced his decision to transfer to Arizona Western College. There remained just two other scholarship quarterbacks on the roster entering spring practice competing against Rypien. On April 12, 2016, after the conclusion of spring practices, Ryan Finley announced he would also be transferring to North Carolina State after he graduated in May.

Rypien was named to three separate award watch lists before the start of fall camp. He was named to the watch lists for the Davey O'Brien Award, which goes to the top collegiate quarterback; the Maxwell Award, which goes to the top collegiate football player of the year; and the Walter Camp Award, which goes to the player of the year in college football. Also before the start of the season, Rypien was named as one of four team captains by his teammates, becoming the first sophomore captain in more than a decade for Boise State.

Rypien's first month of the season came with highs and lows. Off the football field, he lost both his grandmothers, but on the field he led the Broncos to a 5–0 start and earned offensive player of the week honors in the Mountain West Conference after throwing for 391 yards and five touchdowns in the first half against New Mexico.

After starting the season with seven wins, Rypien and the Broncos lost two of their last five games to finish the regular season at 10–2. For Rypien's efforts in the season he earned first-team all-conference honors, his second time receiving the honor.

On December 27, Rypien and Boise State matched up to play against Baylor in the Cactus Bowl in Phoenix, Arizona. Baylor won the game and the Boise State Broncos finished their season with a record of 10–3.

2017

In Rypien's third year at Boise State, he again was entering a season after an offensive coordinator had left. Co-offensive coordinator Scott Huff left to become the offensive line coach at the University of Washington. With the departure of Huff, remaining co-offensive coordinator Zak Hill would be Rypien's offensive coordinator for the season.

On December 26, 2016, the day before the bowl matchup between Boise State and Baylor, it was announced that Tommy Stuart would transfer after the end of the season. This left Rypien as the only quarterback on the roster with playing experience entering the 2017 season.

Rypien was named to four separate award watch lists before the start of fall camp. He was named to the watch lists for the Davey O'Brien Award, which goes to the top collegiate quarterback; the Maxwell Award, which goes to the top collegiate football player of the year; the Walter Camp Award, which goes to the player of the year in college football; and the Wuerffel Trophy, which is awarded to the college football player who best combines exemplary community service with athletic and academic achievement. Also before the start of the season, Rypien represented the offensive side for Boise State at the Mountain West Football Media Days at the Cosmopolitan in Las Vegas, and was named as one of three team captains by his teammates.

Rypien and the Broncos began the season with a win over the Troy Trojans. In that game, Rypien shared time with dual-threat quarterback Montell Cozart, a graduate transfer from Kansas. In the following game against Washington State, the second of the season, Rypien suffered an injury on a sack which forced him to leave the game before the end of the first quarter. As a result of the injury, Rypien missed the subsequent game against New Mexico. Rypien and the Broncos went on to finish the season with a 10–3 regular season record, and winning the Mountain West Championship game against Fresno State. At the conclusion of the season he earned second-team all-conference honors.

On December 16, Rypien and Boise State matched up to play against the University of Oregon in the Las Vegas Bowl in Las Vegas, Nevada. Boise State won the game and finished their season with a record of 11–3.

2018

In Rypien's fourth and final year at Boise State, he would be going into the season without an offensive coordinator change. Offensive coordinator Zak Hill began his second season as the lone offensive coordinator.

Rypien was named to six separate award watch lists before the start of fall camp. He was named to the watch lists for the Maxwell Award, which goes to the top collegiate football player of the year; the Davey O'Brien Award, which goes to the top collegiate quarterback; the Wuerffel Trophy, which is awarded to the college football player who best combines exemplary community service with athletic and academic achievement; the Walter Camp Award, which is awarded to the player of the year in college football; the Johnny Unitas Golden Arm Award, which goes to the nation's most outstanding senior or fourth-year quarterback; and the Manning Award, which is given to the nation's best collegiate quarterback. Also before the start of the season, Rypien represented the offensive side for Boise State at the Mountain West Football Media Days at the Cosmopolitan in Las Vegas. While there, he was chosen as the preseason conference offensive player of the year and was selected to the conference's preseason all-conference team.  At the close of camp, and for the third straight year, Rypien was named as one of three team captains by his teammates for the 2018 season.

Rypien started the year strongly by throwing for 12 touchdowns with zero interceptions through the first four games. After the second game of the season, he won Mountain West Offensive Player of the Week when he led the Broncos to a 62–7 victory against the University of Connecticut, going 21 of 28 passing for 362 yards and four touchdowns with zero interceptions while helping Boise State put up 818 total yards of offense and a 625 yardage gap between the two teams, the largest gap since 2000. During his strong start to the season, Rypien surpassed Kellen Moore for most 300-yard passing games in school history with 17, and finished his career with 21.

Rypien and the Broncos went on to finish the season with a 10–3 regular season record, losing the Mountain West Championship game in overtime against Fresno State. At the conclusion of the season, his efforts won him the MW Player of the year and he was also named the first-team all-conference quarterback of the Mountain West Conference.

On December 26, Rypien and Boise State matched up to play against Boston College in the First Responder Bowl in Dallas, Texas. Due to lightning strikes, the game was suspended in the first quarter and was eventually ruled as a no-contest for both teams. On January 19, 2019, he completed his college football career at the 2019 East–West Shrine Game. He went 10 of 14 passing for 134 yards and a touchdown on a shared rotation.

Rypien finished his collegiate career as the FBS leader in passing yards (13,581) among current players. He finished as the all-time leader in passing yards (13,581), completions (1,036) and 300-yard passing performances (21) in the Mountain West Conference. In addition to his conference records, he ranks second all-time at Boise State in passing yards (13,581), passing touchdowns (90), completions (1,036), attempts (1,618).

College career statistics

Professional career

2019 NFL Draft
Rypien was expected to be selected in the latter half of the 2019 NFL Draft after an impressive career at Boise State, and after putting up impressive passing numbers landing in second in all major passing statistics at Boise State. NFL analysts commented that he was "comfortable and experienced playing from under center" and an "accurate passer on all three levels", but noted concerns over his hand size and lack of arm strength.

Denver Broncos
On April 27, 2019, at the conclusion of the NFL Draft, Rypien tweeted that he would "stay a Bronco" after signing with the Denver Broncos as an undrafted free agent for a guaranteed salary of $146,000 and with a signing bonus of $10,000. Kyle McCarthy, Rypien's agent, also noted that besides the Broncos, there were offers from a double-digit number of teams but it was Rypien's relationship with coordinator Rich Scangarello that was the largest lure in choosing the Broncos.

2019 season

On May 2, 2019, the Broncos reported their signing of Rypien as an undrafted free agent. He was waived on August 31, 2019, and was signed to the practice squad the following day. He was promoted to the active roster on November 1, 2019 to be the backup quarterback to Brandon Allen after starter Joe Flacco suffered a neck injury. On November 30, 2019, the Broncos waived Rypien after Drew Lock was activated off of injured reserve. He was then re-signed to the practice squad two days later. He signed a reserve/future contract with the Broncos on December 31, 2019.

2020 season

On September 5, 2020, Rypien was waived by the Broncos, and was signed to the practice squad the following day. He was promoted to the active roster on September 25, 2020. He got his first in-game action on September 27, 2020 when he entered the game against the Tampa Bay Buccaneers in relief of starter Jeff Driskel. He completed his first 8 passes for 53 yards before throwing a game ending interception during the 28–10 loss.

On September 29, 2020, Rypien was named the starter for the Broncos Week 4 matchup against the New York Jets on Thursday Night Football. In his first NFL start, Rypien led the Broncos to a 37–28 victory over the Jets throwing two touchdowns and for 242 yards and three interceptions. On November 28, 2020, Rypien was placed on the reserve/COVID-19 list after coming in close contact with Jeff Driskel, who tested positive for the virus. Rypien and the other three quarterbacks on the Broncos roster were fined by the team for violating COVID-19 protocols. He was activated on December 1.

2021 season

On August 31, 2021, Rypien was waived by the Broncos and re-signed to the practice squad the next day. He was promoted to the active roster on September 28, 2021.

NFL career statistics

Personal life
Rypien is the nephew of former NFL quarterback Mark Rypien, the cousin of former LFL quarterback Angela Rypien, and a cousin-once-removed of the late Rick Rypien, an NHL enforcer who spent his entire seven year career with the Vancouver Canucks before ending his life at 27 in August of 2011. On his mother's side of the family, Rypien is the nephew of Chris Tormey, an assistant to the Ottawa Redblacks of the CFL. In 2019, prior to the NFL and CFL drafts, Rypien was reportedly working on formally securing Canadian citizenship; Rypien is eligible to hold dual citizenship because of his father's Canadian citizenship.

References

External links

Denver Broncos bio
Boise State Broncos bio

1996 births
Living people
American football quarterbacks
American sportspeople of Canadian descent
Boise State Broncos football players
Denver Broncos players
Players of American football from Spokane, Washington